John Borg Loengard (September 5, 1934 – May 24, 2020) was an American photographer who worked at Life magazine from 1961, and was its picture editor from 1973 to 1987. He taught at the International Center of Photography, New York, The New School for Social Research, New York, and at workshops around the country.

Early life

Born in New York City in 1934, Loengard became interested in photography at the age of eleven, when, at the end of World War II, his father spoke of buying a new camera. Loengard began to take pictures for his high school newspaper. In 1956, when he was a senior at Harvard College, Life magazine asked him to photograph a freighter run aground on Cape Cod—an assignment that began Loengard's long association with the publication. Of his heroes, Henri Cartier-Bresson, W. Eugene Smith, and Robert Frank, Loengard wrote "They mixed their feelings with reportage in strong new ways. It was my plan to do so, too."

Career

He joined the staff of Life magazine in 1961. When Life suspended weekly publication in 1972, Loengard became the picture editor of ten semi-annual Life "Special Reports." He was the picture editor of Time Inc.'s Magazine Development Group, planning and launching People magazine in 1974. He was instrumental, in 1978, in Life's rebirth as a monthly. In 1986, that publication won the first award for "Excellence in Photography" ever given by the American Society of Magazine Editors. Loengard continued as Life's picture editor until 1987. He was the author of ten books on photography.

He taught at the International Center of Photography, New York, The New School for Social Research, New York, and at workshops around the country.

In 2004 Loengard was given the Henry R. Luce "Lifetime Achievement Award" from Time Inc. In 2005 American Photo magazine identified Loengard as "One of the 100 most influential people in photography." "Photographer and picture editor, mentor and oracle, curator and historian, critic and scholar—over the years, John Loengard has assumed all of these roles," wrote Vanity Fair magazine, "with élan and focus, obstinacy and whip-smart intelligence."

He was inducted into the International Photography Hall of Fame in 2018.

Death
He died of heart failure on May 24, 2020 in Manhattan, New York at the age of 85.

Publications

Pictures Under Discussion (New York: Amphoto, 1987), . Photographs by Loengard.
Life Classic Photographs: A Personal Interpretation by John Loengard (Boston: Little, Brown and Company, 1988), . Loengard's selection and commentary.
Life Faces, with Commentary by John Loengard (New York: Macmillan, 1991), . Loengard's selection and commentary.
Celebrating the Negative (New York: Arcade Publishing, Inc., 1994), .
Georgia O'Keeffe at Ghost Ranch (Munich: Schirmer / Mosel, 1995), ; (New York: Stewart, Tabori & Chang, 1995), ; (New York: Te Neues, 1998), 
Life Classic Photographs: A Personal Interpretation by John Loengard, Updated With New Photographs (Boston: Little, Brown and Company, 1996), 
Life Photographers: What They Saw (New York: Bullfinch, 1998), . Interviews by Loengard with 44 photographers who were on the staff of Life between 1936 and 1972.
The Great Life Photographers (New York: Bulfinch, 1988), . Loengard conceived the book, was the contributing editor and wrote the introduction.
As I See It (New York: Vendome, 2005), ; (London: Thames & Hudson, 2005), ; Monografie John Loengard (Paris: Éditions de La Martininiere, 2005), . A retrospective of Loengard's photographs.
Georgia O'Keeffe / John Loengard Paintings & Photographs (Munich: Schirmer / Mosel, 2006), ; Image and Imagination, Georgia O'Keeffe by John Loengard (San Francisco: Chronicle, 2007), Georgia O'Keeffe / John Loengard Paintings & Photographs  (Munich: Schirmer / Mosel, 2016), . Photographs by Loengard and paintings by O'Keeffe. With an introduction by Loengard.
Age of Silver: Encounters with Great Photographers (Brooklyn: powerHouse, 2011), . Loengard's portraits of photographers.
Moment By Moment (New York, Thames & Hudson, 2016), . Photographs By Loengard/

Exhibitions

International Center of Photography, New York City, 1987
Saidye Bronfman Center, Montreal, Quebec, 1996
University of Kentucky Art Museum, Lexington, KY, 2007
The Century Association, New York City, 2009
George Eastman House, Rochester, NY, 2010
Henry Fox Talbot Museum, Lacock Abbey, England, 2010
Celebrating the Negative (traveling exhibition), 2013
International Photography Hall of Fame, St. Louis, MO, 2019

Collections

Loengard's work is held in the following permanent collections:
National Portrait Gallery, Washington, D.C.
Center for Creative Photography, Tucson, Arizona
International Center of Photography, New York
Menil Foundation, Houston, Texas
George Eastman House, Rochester, New York
International Photography Hall of Fame, St. Louis, Missouri

References

External links

Loengard at Gallery M
Interview by Charlie Rose
Blog by Brad Moore (9/20/10), reprint of John Loengard's article "The Role of the Picture Editor"
John Loengard at photoquotes.com

Photographers from New York City
2020 deaths
1934 births
Harvard College alumni
Life (magazine) photojournalists
The New School faculty
American photojournalists
20th-century American photographers
21st-century American photographers
20th-century American male artists
21st-century American male artists